Aleksey Tsvetkov (born 1 September 1981) is a Russian skier. He competed in the Nordic combined event at the 2002 Winter Olympics.

References

1981 births
Living people
Russian male Nordic combined skiers
Olympic Nordic combined skiers of Russia
Nordic combined skiers at the 2002 Winter Olympics
Sportspeople from Yekaterinburg